Helga Pedersen may refer to:

Helga Pedersen (Denmark) (1911–1980), Danish politician
Helga Pedersen (Norway) (born 1973), Norwegian politician